Hanging Gardens is the fifth album by Australian improvised music trio The Necks. It was first released on the Fish of Milk label in 1999 and the ReR label internationally. The album features the single, hour-long eponymous track, improvised by the trio.

Reception
The Guardian review called the album "mesmerising, grandiose music from one of the best bands on the planet."

Track listing
 "Hanging Gardens" - 60:30

Personnel
 Chris Abrahams — piano, electric piano
 Lloyd Swanton — bass
 Tony Buck — drums

References

1999 albums
The Necks albums